Highway 159 (AR 159, Ark. 159, and Hwy. 159) is a designation for eight state highways in Chicot and Desha Counties.

Route description

Louisiana to Eudora

Eudora to Lake Village

Between Lake Village and Eudora, Arkansas, Highway 159 follows the original 1926 alignment of U.S. 65

Halley to Trippe Junction

US 65 to McGehee

From US 278 north, McGehee

Downtown McGehee

AR 138 to Omega

Dumas to Mitchellville

See also

References

External links

159
Transportation in Chicot County, Arkansas
Transportation in Desha County, Arkansas
U.S. Route 65